Robot Warlords, known as  in Japan, is a turn based RPG created by Nexus Interact. It was first released in Japan in 2000 under the title Velvet File. It was published in Europe in 2001 by Midas Interactive under the name Robot Warlords. The storyline features mecha fighting in a war against a terrorist organisation; the player can have a team of up to six characters, though only four can be used in a battle. The mecha themselves are state of the art technology that run on batteries, and can be customised with a variety of melee and ranged weapons, allowing for different strategies. The game received a Japan-only re-release, which fixed several bugs and added support for the Sony PS2 PrintFan with PopEgg.

References

2000 video games
Video games about mecha
Turn-based strategy video games
PlayStation 2 games
PlayStation 2-only games
PlayStation Network games